Essam Heggy is an Egyptian space scientist. Heggy obtained his Ph.D. in astronomy and planetary science in 2002 with distinguished honors from the Paris-Sorbonne University in Paris. His main science interests in space and planetary geophysics covers Mars, the Moon, icy satellites and near-Earth objects. His research involves probing structural, hydrological and volcanic elements in terrestrial and planetary environments using different types of radar imaging and sounding techniques as well as measuring the electromagnetic properties of rocks in the radar frequency range. His research expertise span from laboratory electromagnetic characterization of planetary analog materials, Radar sounding of aquifers in hyper-arid environments, GPR surveys in volcanic and ice-rich environments, FDTD numerical simulations of wave propagation and terrestrial and planetary radars data analysis. Heggy is a member of the science teams of several planetary exploration missions, and he is a contributing scientist to several proposed planetary and terrestrial radar imaging and sounding experiments. Heggy  taught academic classes and mentored several postdocs and graduated students in UCLA, Caltech, Cambridge University, Paris VI & Paris VII universities, Institut de Physique du Globe, Ecole Normale Superieure, University of Houston, Trento University and Columbia University.

Early life
Heggy was born in 1975 in the city of Tripoli in Libya to an Egyptian family; his father is the Egyptian artist Mohamed Heggy. He was raised in Tunisia, Egypt and France in a family passionate about art in a multicultural environment. Heggy's position on the reform of the educational system in Egypt to support a real transition toward a modern, tolerant and democratic society have been subject to several public discussions after the major changes that followed the Egyptian Revolution of 2011. Heggy is a known public figure among Egyptian youth; he served as the Egyptian president advisor for scientific affairs from 2013 to 2014.

References

External links
 Academic advisers, Prof. Pierre Encrenaz & Prof. Philippe Paillou
 

1975 births
Cairo University alumni
French people of Egyptian descent
Living people
Planetary scientists
Paris-Sorbonne University alumni
Egyptian emigrants to the United States